Suparna is a 2020 Sri Lankan Sinhala fantasy thriller and first environmental Sci-fi film, directed by Sujeewa Priyal Yaddehige and produced by Kalyani Ranawaka form North West Films. It features an ensemble cast where Duleeka Marapana in lead role along with Dinakshie Priyasad, Ashan Dias, Darshan Dharmaraj and Sanjeewa Upendra in supportive roles. Music composed by Pabalu Wijegunawardana.

Superna talks about environmental degradation caused by human activity, from genetic predation.

In October 2020, Dhanushka Gunathilake won the award for the Best Cinematography at Indus Valley International Film Festival.

Releasing
Initially planned to release on 31 January 2020, it has been delayed due to prevailing films in cinema theaters. The film was officially screened on 14 February 2020.

Cast
 Duleeka Marapana as Suparna
 Dinakshie Priyasad as Sumali
 Ashan Dias as Indrajith	
 Darshan Dharmaraj as AYO 433	
 Upendra Sanjeewa as King		
 Janak Premalal as Mastor		
 Veena Jayakody as Anula,  Suparna's mother		
 Kalana Gunasekara as Raveen		
 Wilson Gunaratne as Professor		
 Hyacinth Wijeratne as Indrajith's mother			
 Vishwajith Gunasekara		as Chandrasoma, Suparna's father
 Buddhika Jayarathne as Police officer		
 Mali Jayaweerage as mother of raped daughter		
 Wishwa Lanka as Orak
 Richard Mundy		
 Ranjit Rubasinghe		
 Ryan Van Rooyen as Matthew 
 Kenara Weerathunga		
 Wasantha Wittachchi

Soundtrack
The film consists with two songs.

References

External links
 
 Suparna on YouTube
 ඉඩ දුන්නොත් ආයේ පෙන්වනවා

2020s Sinhala-language films
2020 films